The 2002 Lunar New Year Cup (also known as Carlsberg Cup) was a football tournament held in Hong Kong over the first and fourth day of the Chinese New Year holiday.

Participating teams
  China
  Honduras
  Hong Kong League XI (host)
  Slovenia

Squads
Some of the players include:

China
Coach:  Bora Milutinović

Honduras
Coach:  Ernesto Luzardo

Hong Kong League XI
Coach:  Wong Yiu Shun

Slovenia
Coach:  Srečko Katanec

Results
All times given in Hong Kong Time (UTC+8).

Semi-finals

Third place match

Final

Bracket

Statistics

Goalscorers

See also
Hong Kong Football Association
Hong Kong First Division League

References
 Carlsberg Cup 2002, hksssf.com
 XX. Carlsberg Cup Chinese New Years Tournament 2002 - Details, YANSFIELD
 The Hong Kong Football Association Limited 2000/2001 Annual Report, page. 38

2002
2002 in Chinese football
2001–02 in Hong Kong football
2001–02 in Slovenian football
2001–02 in Honduran football